The 14th Pan American Games were held in Santo Domingo, Dominican Republic, from August 1 to August 17, 2003.

Medals

Gold

Men's featherweight (–57 kg): Likar Ramos Concha

Men's road time trial: José Serpa
Women's individual pursuit: María Luisa Calle

Men's – 56 kg: Nelson Castro
Men's – 62 kg: Diego Fernando Salazar
Men's – 85 kg: Héctor Ballesteros
Women's – 53 kg: Mabel Mosquera
Women's – 63 kg: Ubaldina Valoyes
Women's – 69 kg: Tulia Angela Medina
Women's + 75 kg: Carmenza Delgado

Silver

Men's light flyweight (–51 kg): Carlos José Tamara

Men's sprint: Leonardo Narváez
Men's team sprint: Leonardo Narváez, Rodrigo Barros, and Jonathan Marín
Men's madison: Alexander González, and Leonardo Duque

Men's – 77 kg: Ferney Manzano

Bronze

Men's marathon: Diego Colorado
Women's 10,000 metres: Bertha Sánchez

Men's doubles: Jaime Andrés Gómez and Jorge David Romero
Women's singles: Clara Guerrero
Women's doubles: Sara Vargas and Clara Guerrero

Men's bantamweight (–54 kg): Johny Perez
Men's middleweight (–75 kg): Alexander Brand

Men's track pursuit: Alexander González
Men's team pursuit: Alexander González, José Serpa, Arles Castro, and Juan Pablo Forero
Men's points race: Leonardo Duque

Men's – 85 kg: José Oliver Ruíz
Men's – 94 kg: Jairo Cossio
Men's – 105 kg: William Solís

Results by event

Athletics

Track

Road

Field

Boxing

Cycling

Road
José Serpa
 Men's road time trial — 1:04.45 (→ 1st place)
Hernán Bonilla
 Men's road time trial — + 2.39 (→ 8th place)
Paola Madriñan
 Women's road time trial — + 2.01 (→ 4th place)
Sandra Gómez
 Women's road time trial — + 3.21 (→ 10th place)

Mountain bike
Fabio Castañeda
 Men's cross country — + 1 lap (→ 5th place)
Héctor Paez
 Men's cross country — did not finish (→ no ranking)
Flor Delgadillo
 Women's cross country — + 1 lap (→ 7th place)

Swimming

Men's competition

Triathlon

References

See also
Colombia at the 2004 Summer Olympics

Nations at the 2003 Pan American Games
P
Colombia at the Pan American Games